) is a Shinto shrine located in the city of Yasu, Shiga Prefecture, Japan.  The kami worshipped at this shrine is Ame-no-mikage-no-mikoto, Amaterasu's grandson, who in legend, descended onto 432-meter Mount Mikami during the reign of Emperor Kōrei (290 - 215 BC) to become the shintai of the mountain.

History
The foundation of Mikami Jinja is uncertain. While it is known that Fujiwara no Fuhito ordered the construction of a shrine at the current location in 718 AD, archaeological excavations have found the that the area was connected with rituals pertaining to Mount Mikami from a much earlier period. In the Meiji period, 24 dōtaku were excavated at the foot of the mountain, indicating that it was worshipped from the Yayoi period. 

The shrine is mentioned in several occasions in the Nihon Sandai Jitsuroku completed in 901 and is also mentioned in the Engishiki list of shrines in Ōmi Province dated 927 AD. 

In 1876, following the Meiji restoration and the establishment of the Modern system of ranked Shinto shrines under State Shinto, the shrine was officially designated a “county shrine”. It was promoted to the rank of “prefectural shrine” in 1913 and to Kanpei-taisha, or Imperial shrine of the 2nd rank in 1924.

Mikami Jinja is a ten-minute drive from Yasu Station on then JR West Biwako Line.
   Beppyo shrines

Cultural Properties
  The shrine's main building is estimated to have been built in the latter half of the Kamakura Period from its various stylistic details. If fuses Shinto shrine architecture with Buddhist elements such as Irimoya-zukuri, style roof, plaster walls, and "Renko" windows. It was declared a protected building as early as 1899, but was formally designated as a National Treasure in 1952. 

  Dating from then later Kamukura period, it was designated as an Important Cultural Property (ICP) in 1899.

   Dating from the late Kamakura period, it was designated as an ICP in 1899

 Belonging to a subsidiary shrine within the same compound, this structure dates from the late Muromachi period. It is designated as an ICP in 1931

Festivals
The "Zuiki Festival of Mikami", celebrated every October as a harvesting festival, is an Important Intangible Folk Cultural Property. The rice for Emperor Showa's first Niiname Festival in 1925 was grown in a paddy field nearby, which is celebrated every year in June by a rice planting ceremony.

Gallery

See also
 Mount Mikami
 List of National Treasures of Japan (shrines)

References

External links

 Official website
Shiga - Biwako Visitor's Guide

Shinto shrines in Shiga Prefecture
Ōmi Province
Yasu, Shiga
National Treasures of Japan
Important Cultural Properties  of Japan